Henry O. Mayfield (born 1907) is an American miner and social activist. Mayfield was one of the prominent Black miners who played an active role in forming the new Congress of Industrial Organizations (CIO) between 1935 and 1955.

Biography
Henry O. Mayfield was born in 1907 in Florida. He received a primary school education before migrating to the foundries, mills and mines of Jefferson County, Alabama. Mayfield became a miner and worked for seven years in the biggest foundry in Birmingham, the Stockholm Pipe and Fitting Company and became a member of the United Mine Workers, one of the few labor unions of the time. From that union he became an active organizer of the Congress of Industrial Organizations (CIO) in the late 1930s. The CIO flourished during the time that Mayfield was an organizer. Very poor working conditions, which led to a list of demands as part of a strike that included higher pay and better working hours. The communities that Mayfield targeted as part of the organizing drives were miners, churches, civic organizations and voters' leagues. He was of the strand of black male leaders that tried to abstain from drinking, opposed womanizing, and felt free to intervene in comrades' marital problems. Mayfield was a singer in the East Birmingham Stars quartet. He had two children in his first marriage, and after he and his wife separated, her family "cut him up", so he fled to Greenwood to live with his mother. Mayfield joined the NAACP around 1938 with his good friend and fellow member of the Communist Party, Hosea Hudson. He enlisted in the military in 1943 during World War II at Fort Benning, Georgia.

Communist Party
Henry O. Mayfield was recruited into the Communist Party (CPUSA) by Hosea Hudson, with whom he worked in the CIO, and his main goal was to attract radical black workers. To educate himself on Communist beliefs, including self-determination, he began by reading The Liberator with John Beidel, West Hibbard, Joe Howard, Charles DeBardelebel and Hudson. He was selected to go to Russia during his time with the Party to attend a Communist training school, and was arrested in 1950 as part of Birmingham's "Anti-Red Drive." They found Communist literature at his house during the arrest. He became an active member of the Party and during spring of 1932 was selected to be part of the Southern Section Committee, and later becoming a District 17 bureau member, two roles that increased his involvement even more. In 1938 he was chosen as a delegate to the national Party convention in New York City, another high honor.

Mayfield's involvement with the Party included helping to create CPUSA-led trade unions that allowed Black workers, something that was unheard of at the time. He also used his ties in the CIO to urge members to join initiatives he was heading at the Party: joining anti-poll tax campaigns, registering to vote; reading New South and Daily Worker, two Communist newspapers; and attending nonunion political functions headed by the Party. Another of Mayfield's roles in the Communist Party was delivering the Party's messages to prospective members in the South. Hudson was adamant about Mayfield having this role because of his approachability and well-spoken nature. This largely meant handing out leaflets with the Party's 15-point program. The program's aims included confronting police brutality against people of color, ending poll taxes, federal housing, and voting rights for all citizens. As part of this last initiative, voting rights for all citizens, Mayfield and others founded the Right to Vote Club. This made procedural and legal information about voting easy to access, and helped communities that were being barred from voting, largely the black community. This also marked the first time that the Communist Party created a program with the main focus of equal voting rights.

Connections to other Black activist leaders, and FBI surveillance
Through his participation in the Communist Party, Mayfield collaborated with several other historically prominent Black activists. Many of these organizers were active in the Congress of Industrial Organizations, which was created in 1935 to advocate for the rights of laborers, specifically in the southern United States. Among these leaders were Mayfield, Hosea Hudson, Andy Brown, and Ebb Cox. Ebb Cox was one of the first Black district representatives of the Steel Union, and he lived in Wilkes County, North Carolina. He worked with Mayfield in the fight for labor rights. Hosea Hudson, who wrote an autobiography about his life, was a civil rights leader from Georgia who became one of the most prominent civil rights leaders in Birmingham, Alabama. Hudson was a sharecropper in the south and was displaced to become an industrial worker. Hudson and Mayfield met each other through a city relief-work project, and Hudson is one of the people that recruited Mayfield to the Communist Party. They were also closely associated due to their common connections in the Congress of Industrial Organizations and the Southern Negro Youth Congress. Thus, Hudson's autobiography provides important insight not only into his own life and the organizing of Black activists in the south, but also Mayfield's life, which is rarely detailed in American history.

Mayfield, Hudson, and Brown, along with other Black activists like John Bedell and Sam Hall, were among those targeted by the FBI for their radicalism and participation in the Communist Party. Mayfield and others had to leave their homes in Birmingham for personal safety due to the FBI's heavy surveillance and harassment. Specifically, Theophilus Eugene "Bull" Connor of the FBI was targeting these Black activists and conducting raids against anyone he considered a "radical". The FBI would do anything in their power to mark Mayfield, Hudson, and the others as criminals, including spreading misinformation that Hudson was a murderer. Henry Mayfield and Sam Hall both lost their homes that they were buying under GI loans due to this FBI interference in their lives. Furthermore, they were with Hosea Hudson when she had to leave Birmingham due to Connor's extreme surveillance and invasive raids. Evidently, Henry Mayfield and other Black leaders were all targeted by law enforcement and the U.S. government for their perceived radicalism.

Southern Negro Youth Congress
Henry Mayfield became more widely known as a leader in the movement for Black freedom and equality after his involvement in the founding convention for the Southern Negro Youth Congress (SNYC). The SNYC was the predecessor of the SNCC and started in 1937. The goal of the SNYC was freedom, equality, and opportunity for Black people in America, and it was especially focused on the struggles of Black youth. The SNYC's first convention was located in Richmond, Virginia, and Mayfield acted as one of the founders in this convention along with over 500 delegates from 23 states and over 2,000 observers in the crowd.

Mayfield was especially prominent in the SNYC directly following World War II. Since Mayfield fought in World War II, he was a notable leader of the struggle for the right to vote in the 1940s. Mayfield led 150 Black veterans to the Jefferson County Court House to demand the right to vote, and he also called a conference with veterans to organize and discuss additional issues such as vocational training, housing, and jobs. Despite Mayfield and other known Communist Party members being present in the SNYC, the organization denied any connections with the Communist Party. By 1949, the SNYC was effectively nonexistent due to internal disputes that weakened the functionality of the organization.

Impact
Overall, Henry O. Mayfield made an important impact as a Black activist and leader of the Communist Party and the Southern Negro Youth Congress (SNYC). He not only served the United States as a soldier in World War II, but he also led veterans in the battle for the right to vote following the war. Furthermore, he worked with other prominent Black leaders in the Congress of Industrial Organizations to advocate for the rights of laborers, especially in the southern United States. Mayfield endured extensive FBI surveillance and was even arrested in his dedication to the Communist Party and the fight for Black freedom in America. Mayfield's leadership and organizing are often overlooked in American history, and while he was well-known within the communities that he led, his impact has not been adequately represented in historical literature.

References

1907 births
Congress of Industrial Organizations people
American communists
NAACP activists
Year of death missing